Nardone v. United States, 308 U.S. 338 (1939), was a U.S. Supreme Court case in which the Court ruled that evidence obtained via warrantless wiretaps, in violation of the Communications Act of 1934, was inadmissible in federal court. The Court ruled that use of evidence directly obtained from wiretapping, such as the conversations themselves, and indirectly, such as evidence obtained through knowledge gained from wiretapped conversations, was inadmissible in trial court.

References 

 Evidence case law
 Surveillance
 Warrants
 1939 in the United States
 Telephone tapping
United States Supreme Court cases
United States Supreme Court cases of the Hughes Court
United States Fourth Amendment case law